Fisken is a surname. Notable people with the surname include:

 Archibald Fisken (1897–1970), Australian politician
 Geoffrey Fisken (1916–2011), New Zealand fighter pilot
 Gregor Fisken (born 1964), British racing driver and businessman
 William Fisken (died 1883), Scottish presbyterian minister